Wife, Doctor and Nurse is a 1937 American comedy film directed by Walter Lang and starring Loretta Young.

Plot

Cast
 Loretta Young as Ina Heath Lewis
 Warner Baxter as Dr. Judd Lewis
 Virginia Bruce as Miss Stephens aka Steve
 Jane Darwell as Mrs. Krueger
 Sidney Blackmer as Dr. Therberg
 Maurice Cass as Pompout
 Minna Gombell as Constance
 Margaret Irving as Mrs. Cunningham
 Bill Elliott as Bruce Thomas (as Gordon Elliott)
 Lynn Bari (uncredited)

References

External links
 

1937 films
1937 comedy films
American comedy films
American black-and-white films
Films directed by Walter Lang
Films with screenplays by Lamar Trotti
Films scored by Arthur Lange
Films with screenplays by Kathryn Scola
20th Century Fox films
1930s English-language films
1930s American films